Susanne Hirt (born 15 August 1973 in Augsburg) is a German slalom canoeist who competed at the international level from 1990 to 2000.

Hirt won a gold medal in the K1 team event at the 1999 ICF Canoe Slalom World Championships in La Seu d'Urgell. She is the overall World Cup champion in K1 from 1999. She also won a bronze medal in the K1 team event at the 2000 European Championships.

Hirt also finished tenth in the K1 event at the 2000 Summer Olympics in Sydney.

World Cup individual podiums

References

1973 births
Canoeists at the 2000 Summer Olympics
German female canoeists
Living people
Olympic canoeists of Germany
Place of birth missing (living people)
Medalists at the ICF Canoe Slalom World Championships
Sportspeople from Augsburg